Francis Leigh may refer to:

 Sir Francis Leigh (MP for Oxford) (1579–1625), English MP for Oxford
 Francis Leigh, 1st Earl of Chichester (1598–1653), Baronet, courtier and Royalist MP for Warwick
 Francis Leigh (MP for Kent) (c. 1651–1711), English MP for Kent
 Francis Leigh (MP for Wexford) (1758–1839), MP for Wexford Borough and New Ross
 Francis Leigh (died 1644) (1592–1644), English politician
 Francis Leigh, 3rd Baron Leigh, British peer and Warwickshire landowner

See also 

 
 Francis Lee (disambiguation)